Dendrobium section Densiflora is a section of the genus Dendrobium.

Description
Plants in this section have pseudobulbous stems with pendulous inflorescence, borne from leaf axils.

Distribution
Plants from this section are found in China, the Himalayas, and Southeast Asia.

Species
Dendrobium section Densiflora comprises the following species:

References

Orchid subgenera